Erika Abels d'Albert (also known as Erika Abels) (1896–1975) was an Austrian painter and graphic artist.

Life and work
Her mother, Anna Emilie Mewes, was from the Berlin area. Abels d'Albert received a private education in Fine Arts in Vienna. She decided early to become a professional artist: at the age of 16 she participated in a group show (contributing portraits, nudes, still lifes and fashion designs). In subsequent years she participated in exhibitions at various galleries, at the Imperial and Royal Museum of Art and Industry , at the Temple of Theseus in the Volksgarten and at the Vienna Künstlerhaus. In 1930 she took part in the exhibition of the Austrian Association of Women Artists.

Between 1933 and 1935 she emigrated to Paris. She showed works in 1935 in the Gallery Gregoire Schustermann and in 1938 in the Salon d'Automne. After this her artistic activities are unknown.

Erika Abels d'Albert died in Paris in 1975.

She painted portraits, still lifes and nudes. There are only three works by her known to be extant in the original. The Vienna Museum owns her oil painting Strassenbahnschaffnerin from 1919, and in the Albertina are a charcoal drawing, Kopf einer Frau in mittleren Jahren (1924), and a chalk drawing, Sitzender Rückenakt (1921).

References

Footnotes

Sources 
 Franz Planer. Das Jahrbuch der Wiener Gesellschaft: Biographische Beiträge zur Wiener Zeitgeschichte. Vienna: Planer, 1929. OCLC 257558256
 Heinrich Fuchs. Die österreichischen Maler der Geburtenjahrgänge 1881–1900. Ergänzungsband zu Die österreichischen Maler des 19. Jahrhunderts. Volume 1: A–L. Vienna: Fuchs, 1976. OCLC 463109834.
 Elke Doppler-Wagner. Blickwechsel und Einblick - Künstlerinnen in Österreich. Aus der Sammlung des Historischen Museums Wien. 256. Sonderausstellung des Historischen Museums der Stadt Wien in der Hermesvilla. 2000. OCLC 44460255

External links
 

1896 births
1975 deaths
20th-century Austrian women artists
Artists from Berlin
Austrian women painters
Austrian graphic designers
Women graphic designers